Lamin Conteh (20 June 1976 – 5 May 2022), widely known by his nickname Junior Tumbu, was a Sierra Leonean professional footballer who played as an attacking midfielder. He represented the Sierra Leone national team from 1994 until 2002.

Biography
Conteh was born and raised in Freetown, Sierra Leone, to Muslim parents from the limba ethnic group. A Muslim himself, Conteh grew up in poverty. As a teenager, he was frequently seen playing street football across Freetown with boys much older than he was. As a teenager, he was considered the best secondary school footballer in Sierra Leone. He dropped out of the Ahmmadiyya Muslim Secondary School in Freetown in 1992 to become a professional footballer.

Conteh made his international debut for Sierra Leone in 1994, at the age of seventeen.

Though a Muslim, Lamin was highly involved in the rastafarian movement and was a big fan of reggae star Bob Marley.

Conteh died in the early hours of 5 May 2022.

Career
At the age of 18, Conteh was selected to play for Sierra Leone in the 1994 Africa Cup of Nations held in Tunisia. He was also picked in the squad for the following tournament in South Africa two years later. After a match against Nigeria in 2000, Conteh claimed that the Sierra Leone Football Association owed him $2,000, and refused to play for his country until the money was paid to him. The matter was later resolved, and in 2002, he took over the captaincy of the national team from Mohamed Kallon.

Honours
Al Wahda
 UAE Pro League: 1998–99, 2000–01
 UAE President's Cup: 1999–2000
 UAE Federation Cup: 2001

Perlis F.A.
 Malaysia Super League: 2005
 Malaysia Cup: 2004, 2006

References

External links
 
 

1976 births
2022 deaths
Sierra Leonean Muslims
Sportspeople from Freetown
Sierra Leonean footballers
Association football midfielders
Sierra Leone international footballers
1994 African Cup of Nations players
1996 African Cup of Nations players
2. Bundesliga players
UAE First Division League players
UAE Pro League players
K. Beerschot V.A.C. players
SV Meppen players
Boavista F.C. players
Varzim S.C. players
Al Wahda FC players
Fujairah FC players
Perlis FA players
Negeri Sembilan FA players
Pelita Bandung Raya players
Sierra Leonean expatriate footballers
Sierra Leonean expatriate sportspeople in Belgium
Expatriate footballers in Belgium
Sierra Leonean expatriate sportspeople in Germany
Expatriate footballers in Germany
Sierra Leonean expatriate sportspeople in Portugal
Expatriate footballers in Portugal
Sierra Leonean expatriate sportspeople in Malaysia
Expatriate footballers in Malaysia
Sierra Leonean expatriate sportspeople in Indonesia
Expatriate footballers in Indonesia
Sierra Leonean expatriate sportspeople in the United Arab Emirates
Expatriate footballers in the United Arab Emirates